Karakulak is a village in the Kızıltepe District of Mardin Province in Turkey. The village is populated by Kurds of the Xalecan tribe and had a population of 174 in 2021.

References 

Villages in Kızıltepe District
Kurdish settlements in Mardin Province